Irfan Bakti Abu Salim is a Malaysian football coach, who is head coach of the Malaysia Premier League club Kuching City.

Playing career
He had played with Kelantan FA and ATM FA in 1970s. He also was in the Malaysia squad for the 1976 AFC Asian Cup in Tehran, Iran.

Coaching career

Beginnings
He spent most of his early coaching days as a coach with the Football Association of Malaysia in Wisma FAM. He first worked as a state coach with the Negri Sembilan team, and later joined Penang FA and TMFC respectively. In 2007, he suddenly resigned from TMFC to coach an Indonesian team, Persipura Jayapura. He returned to Malaysian football in 2008, joining Perlis FA. He later left Perlis and joined Terengganu FA for the 2010/11 season.
He was the head coach of Selangor FA from 2012 until his resignation in 2013.

Felda

Irfan was unveiled as new coach of Felda United FC in November 2013.

With Felda, he guided them to the 2014 Malaysia FA Cup Final, where they lost 2–1 to Pahang, conceding goals at the last minute after leading for the long period of the game. Felda continued their revitalized season by performing well in that year's Malaysia Cup with a win against a strong Johor Darul Ta'zim F.C. team at rainy muddy pitch of MPS Stadium by 4–3, but lost in the second leg of the semi final. In the domestic campaign they finished second which saw only PDRM managed to prevented them from winning the Malaysia second tier division.

In 2015, Felda finished the season in 5th placed and make it to semi final of Malaysia cup.

In 2016, Felda ended the season as runners-up, their best position ever since inception. But Irfan left the team at the end of the season to take the head coach position of Terengganu for the second time.

Terengganu

Irfan was tasked to bring back Terengganu to their glory days after number of coached comes in comes out end up with poor tactical, bad result cost the team relegation to premier league. Their best achievement was when Irfan was their head coach by winning the 2011 FA cup, super league & Malaysia cup runners up in 1 single season. On 20 October 2018, he managed to bring Terengganu advance to the 2018 Malaysia Cup final when Terengganu beaten heavily favourite Johor Darul Ta'zim (JDT) with 3–2 score aggregate but loss to Perak in penalty shootout (4-1).

Achievement

As a Player

Kelantan FA
FAM Cup
1971(Runner Up), 1972 (Runner Up)
Kings Gold Cup
1972, 1973 (Runner Up)

As a Coach

Malaysia U23
Bangabandhu Cup
1997

Penang FA
FA Cup Malaysia
2000(Runner Up),2002
Malaysia Charity Shield
2003
Malaysia Super League
2000(Runner Up),2001

Perlis FA
Malaysia Charity Shield
2008

Terengganu FA
FA Cup Malaysia
2011
Malaysia Cup
2011(Runner Up)
Malaysia Super League
2011(Runner Up)
Malaysia Super League
2018 (Runner Up)

Felda United F.C.
Malaysia Premier League
2014(Runner Up)
FA Cup Malaysia
2014(Runner Up)
Malaysia Super League
2016(Runner Up)

Individual
National Football Award
Best Coach: 2011

References

1951 births
Living people
People from Perak
Malaysian footballers
Malaysia international footballers
Malaysian football managers
kelantan FA players
ATM FA players
1976 AFC Asian Cup players
Perlis FA managers
Persipura Jayapura managers
Association football midfielders
Malaysian people of Malay descent
Malaysian expatriate football managers